The Old Lesbian Oral Herstory Project (OLOHP) is a collection of interviews to document and appreciate the lives of lesbians born in the first half of the 1900s. The Project was created by Arden Eversmeyer. As of January 2022, the Project has conducted over 750 interviews. Each Herstory contains a transcript of the interview as well as secondary documents pertaining to the Herstory subject, such as photographs, artwork, and newspaper clippings. The interviewees come from a variety of backgrounds and places, most, but not all, within the United States. The OLOHP is focused on interviewing women age 70 and older. Approximately 500 of the OLOHP interviews are currently archived in the Sophia Smith Collection at Smith College.

Created by Arden Eversmeyer the project seeks to document the life stories of women from past generations, including images and other supplementary documents. Eversmeyer was inspired to gather these oral histories when she observed friends passing away. Concerned that their stories would never be shared, she created the OLOHP. Interviewees are asked specific questions re their lesbian life. In an effort to put what they include about their lesbianism in context, they are not limited to sharing only about that subject. Much of the material is autobiographical in nature. 

LGBT and ageing
History of women in Massachusetts
Lesbian culture in the United States
Lesbian history in the United States
Lesbian organizations in the United States
LGBT culture in Massachusetts
Old age in the United States
Oral history
Smith College
1997 in LGBT history